Sadra is a vocal genre of Hindustani classical music from the Indian subcontinent. Compositions that exist in the meters  (tala) teevra (7 beats), sool (10 beats), chau (12 beats), or 10-beat Jhaptal are considered Sadra.

References

Indian styles of music
Hindustani music genres
Hindustani music terminology